She's No Lady is a 1937 American comedy film directed by Charles Vidor and starring Ann Dvorak, John Trent and Harry Beresford.

Cast

References

Bibliography
 Jan-Christopher Horak. Lovers of Cinema: The First American Film Avant-garde, 1919-1945. Univ of Wisconsin Press, 1995.

External links
 

1937 films
1937 comedy films
American comedy films
Paramount Pictures films
American black-and-white films
1930s English-language films
1930s American films